Roxboro Male Academy and Methodist Parsonage is a historic school and church parsonage located at 315 N. Main Street in Roxboro, Person County, North Carolina.  The original main block was built between 1840 and 1854, as a two-story, single-pile, frame building with Greek Revival style design elements.  A two-story addition with Italianate style design elements was added in the late-19th century.  The house took on some Colonial Revival style design elements with the addition of a front porch and interior changes in that style.  It is one of the oldest buildings still standing in the town of Roxboro and served as a Methodist parsonage from 1854 to 1915.

The house was added to the National Register of Historic Places in 1982.

References

Methodist churches in North Carolina
Methodist schools in the United States
Boys' schools in the United States
Properties of religious function on the National Register of Historic Places in North Carolina
Greek Revival architecture in North Carolina
Colonial Revival architecture in North Carolina
Italianate architecture in North Carolina
Buildings and structures in Person County, North Carolina
Defunct schools in North Carolina
National Register of Historic Places in Person County, North Carolina
Christian schools in North Carolina